Abortion in New Mexico is legal at all stages of pregnancy, except in the city of Hobbs, where a local ordinance was passed in November 2022 to prevent abortion clinics from operating. The number of abortion clinics in New Mexico has declined over the years, with 26 in 1982, 20 in 1992 and 11 in 2014. There were 4,500 legal abortions in 2014.

In New Mexico politics, the Democratic Party of New Mexico supports access to abortion while the Republican Party of New Mexico opposes abortion, including calling for restricting or banning the procedure.

History

Legislative history 
In the late 1960s and early 1970s, Arkansas, Colorado, Georgia, Maryland, New Mexico, North Carolina and Oregon made reforms to their abortion laws, with most of these states providing more detailed medical guidance on when therapeutic abortions could be performed. In 1969, the New Mexico legislature passed a law that made it a felony for anyone to provide a woman with an abortion unless it was needed to save her life, or because her pregnancy was a result of rape or incest. The U.S. Supreme Court's decision in 1973's Roe v. Wade barred states from regulating abortion in the first trimester; consequently, New Mexico's 1969 abortion law became unenforceable. (However, the Supreme Court overturned Roe v. Wade in Dobbs v. Jackson Women's Health Organization,  later in 2022.) In March 2019, the legislature considered a bill that would have repealed the 1969 law. While the New Mexico House of Representatives passed the repeal bill, it was defeated in the State Senate by a vote of 24–18. In February 2021, the repeal bill passed the Senate; it was signed into law in March 2021. The bill faced opposition from state Republicans.

In 2017, New Mexico, Washington, Illinois, Alaska, Maryland, Massachusetts, Connecticut, and New Jersey allowed qualified non-physicians to prescribe drugs for medical abortions only. New Mexico had few abortion restrictions in comparison to other states as of May 1, 2018. There are no waiting periods, no required parental consent, and no inability to use state funding for an abortion.

Clinic history 

Between 1982 and 1992, the number of abortion clinics in the state decreased by six, going from 26 in 1982 to twenty in 1992. In 2014, there were eleven facilities which provided abortions of which nine were abortion clinics. In 2014, 91% of the counties in the state did not have an abortion clinic. That year, 48% of women in the state aged 15–44 lived in a county without an abortion clinic. In March 2016, there were six Planned Parenthood clinics in the state. In 2017, Planned Parenthood closed three clinics in the state.  This was done around their plans to try to consolidate reproductive services they offered in the New Mexico. Later that year, there were three total Planned Parenthood clinics in the state. At the time, the population was 456,213 for women aged 15–49 of which two offered abortion services.

Statistics 
In the period between 1972 and 1974, there were zero recorded illegal abortion deaths in the state. In 1990, 181,000 women in the state faced the risk of an unintended pregnancy. Between 2011 and 2014, there was a 10% decline in the number of abortions performed in the state. In 2013, among white women aged 15–19, there were  abortions 150, 20 abortions for black women aged 15–19, 370 abortions for Hispanic women aged 15–19, and 70 abortions for women of all other races. In 2014, 51% of adults said in a poll by the Pew Research Center that abortion should be legal in all or most cases. In 2017, the state had an infant mortality rate of 5.9 deaths per 1,000 live births.

Abortion financing 
Seventeen states including New Mexico used their own funds to cover all or most "medically necessary" abortions sought by low-income women under Medicaid, thirteen of which are required by state court orders to do so. In 2010, the state had 1,270 publicly funded abortions, of which were 0 federally funded and 1,270 were state funded. Public funding was still available in May 2018.

Abortion rights views and activities 

Women from the state participated in marches supporting abortion rights as part of a #StoptheBans movement in May 2019.

Anti-abortion views and activities 

On December 6, 2007, Chad Altman and Sergio Baca were arrested for the arson of Dr. Curtis Boyd's clinic in Albuquerque. Baca's girlfriend had scheduled an appointment for an abortion at the clinic.

References 

New Mexico
Healthcare in New Mexico
Women in New Mexico